Byrsonima  coccolobifolia is a species of plant in the Malpighiaceae family. It is found in Bolivia, Brazil, Guyana, and Venezuela.

References

External links
 
 

 coccolobifolia